The Bayer designation ψ Aquarii (psi Aquarii, ψ Aqr) is shared by three stars/star systems in the constellation Aquarius:

 ψ1 Aquarii (91 Aquarii), a multiple star system with an exoplanet orbiting the giant primary
 ψ2 Aquarii (93 Aquarii), a solitary Be star
 ψ3 Aquarii (95 Aquarii), a binary star system

All of them were members of the asterism 羽林軍 (Yǔ Lín Jūn), Palace Guard, in the Encampment mansion.

References

Lists of stars
Aquarii, Psi
Aquarius (constellation)

sk:Psí Aquarii